Le Vésinet–Le Pecq is a railway station in Le Vésinet, France, built in 1972, on the A1 branch of the Paris Region RER commuter rail line A. It primarily serves the communities of Le Vésinet, Le Pecq, and southern Montesson in the western suburbs of Paris.

Services and Station
The frequency of services is a train every 10 minutes during peak hours, 12 trains per hour at peak times, and a train every 15 minutes in the evenings. It also acts as a terminus for some trains at peak hours.

This station contains 2 platforms with 3 tracks, for which the third (center track) is used solely for westbound trains making their terminus here instead of Saint-Germain-en-Laye. The two outer tracks are used for standard routing trains.

Trains departing eastward from this station take about 25 minutes (with stops) to reach the central Châtelet – Les Halles station in Paris. Westbound trains take about 6 minutes to reach the terminus station St. Germain-en-Laye.

Connections

Bus
The station is served by lines 3A, 3AC, 3C, 7, 7SC, 7SG, 19, 20, 21, 21M, and 22 of the RATP/SNCF bus network, and afterhours via line N153 of the Noctilien (night-time) bus network.

Railway stations in Yvelines
Réseau Express Régional stations
Railway stations in France opened in 1837